The Association of Jesuit University Presses (AJUP) was an association of North American university presses whose parent institutions were members of the Association of Jesuit Colleges and Universities. Georgetown University Press and Fordham University Press were the two largest members in terms of publications.

Activities
Members of the Association of Jesuit University Presses met once a year. Members general met to discuss issues facing the AJUP, such as potential cooperative advertising strategies for religious books and scholarly journals.

Members
The AJUP was chartered by eleven founding Jesuit university presses, including:

 Boston College Press
 Creighton University Press
 Fordham University Press
 Georgetown University Press
 Loyola New Orleans Press
 Marquette University Press
 Rockhurst University Press
 Saint Joseph's University Press
 Saint Louis University Press
 University of San Francisco Press
 University of Scranton Press

References

 
University presses of the United States
Presses